N'Dri Thérèse Assié-Lumumba is Ivorian researcher who studies the African diaspora and education. She is a Professor of Africana Studies in the College of Arts and Sciences at Cornell University. She also serves as President of the World Council of Comparative Education Societies and Chair of UNESCO's Management of Social Transformations Scientific Advisory Committee.

Early life and education 
Assié-Lumumba was born and raised in Côte d'Ivoire. She earned her bachelor's degree at the Lumière University Lyon 2, where she studied sociology and history. She moved to the United States for her graduate studies, where she earned her doctoral degree at the University of Chicago in 1982. Her research considered social inequality in Africa. In 1991 Assié-Lumumba moved to the Cornell University as a Fulbright Senior Fellow.

Research and career 
Assié-Lumumba studies the African diaspora, social institutions and African social history. She spent 2003 as a Professor in the Center for the Study of International Cooperation in Education at Hiroshima University.

She works on ways to improve the access of students from underserved communities to college. She has said that it will take more than targeted scholarships; but students must be supported in how to succeed once they get to college. 

Assié-Lumumba worked with UNESCO to imagine what life might be like after the COVID-19 pandemic. She  serves as Chair of the scientific advisory committee for the UNESCO Management of Social Transformations (MOST) program. As part of her work with UNESCO, Assié-Lumumba coordinates regular visits of Cornell University students to the United Nations, where they work toward projects that reduce gender inequality around the world. In July 2020 Assié-Lumumba was made the Director of the Institute for African Development.

Awards and honours 

 2006 Elected Fellow of the World Academy of Art and Science
 2010 New York State African(a) Studies Association Distinguished Africanist Award
 2012 Frank Scruggs Faculty Fellow
 2017 New York State African(a) Studies Association Ali A. Mazrui Outstanding Publication/Book & Educational Activities Award

Selected publications

References 

African studies
Living people
Year of birth missing (living people)
Cornell University faculty
UNESCO officials